Valerie Fleming (born December 18, 1976) is an American bobsledder who has competed since 2003. At the 2006 Winter Olympics in Turin, she won a silver in the two-woman event with teammate and future wife Shauna Rohbock.

Fleming also won three bronze medals at the FIBT World Championships (Two-woman: 2005, 2007; Mixed team: 2009).

Born in San Francisco, Fleming lives in Park City, Utah.

Career highlights

 Olympic Winter Games
 2006 – Torino,  2nd with Shauna Rohbock
 World Championships
 2005 – Calgary,  3rd with Shauna Rohbock
 2007 – St. Moritz,  3rd with Shauna Rohbock
 World Cup
 2004 – Igls,  3rd with Shauna Rohbock
 2005 – Cesana,  2nd with Shauna Rohbock
 2005 – Calgary,  2nd with Shauna Rohbock
 2005 – Lake Placid,  3rd with Shauna Rohbock
 2005 – Igls,  3rd with Shauna Rohbock
 2005 – Cortina d'Ampezzo,  3rd with Shauna Rohbock
 2006 – Calgary,  1st with Shauna Rohbock
 2006 – Park City,  1st with Shauna Rohbock
 2006 – Lake Placid,  3rd with Shauna Rohbock
 2007 – Igls,  2nd with Shauna Rohbock
 2007 – Cesana,  2nd with Shauna Rohbock
 2007 – Winterberg,  2nd with Shauna Rohbock
 2007 – Königssee,  2nd with Shauna Rohbock
 2007 – Park City,  3rd with Shauna Rohbock
 2008 – Cesana,  2nd with Shauna Rohbock

References
 Bobsleigh two-woman Olympic medalists since 2002
 Bobsleigh two-woman world championship medalists since 2000
 FIBT profile
 FIBT World Championships 2007 bobsleigh two-woman results
 United States Olympic Committee profile

1976 births
Living people
American female bobsledders
Bobsledders at the 2006 Winter Olympics
Olympic silver medalists for the United States in bobsleigh
Sportspeople from San Francisco
Medalists at the 2006 Winter Olympics
21st-century American women